Hsc70-interacting protein also known as suppression of tumorigenicity 13 (ST13) is a protein that in humans is encoded by the ST13 gene.

Function 

The protein encoded by this gene is an adaptor protein that mediates the association of the heat shock proteins HSP70 and HSP90. This protein has been shown to be involved in the assembly process of glucocorticoid receptor, which requires the assistance of multiple molecular chaperones. The expression of this gene is reported to be downregulated in colorectal carcinoma tissue suggesting that is a candidate tumor suppressor gene.

References

Further reading

Co-chaperones